Nautilus Minerals Inc. was an underwater mineral exploration company headquartered in Toronto, Ontario, Canada. It was the first company to commercially explore deep sea mining of the seafloor for massive sulfide systems, a potential source of high grade copper, gold, zinc and silver. As of November 2019, the company filed for bankruptcy.

History
, Nautilus planned to commence production utilizing a newly constructed mining ship in the territorial waters of Papua New Guinea.

The world's first deep-sea mining robots, built for Nautilus by Soil Machine Dynamics, were ready to go since 2012.

In 2015, the company claimed to fall victim to a cyber scam where a payment of $10 million was made to the wrong account. No investigation report was ever made public to shareholders and the company stated it could not give any assurances that internal fraud was prevented. PWC did not record this fraudulent cyber scam in their annual 2015 audit. The CFO at the time, now works for Lepidico Ltd.

As of 2016, a mining ship was being built and scheduled to depart for Papua New Guinea in 2018.

The company had planned to grow its tenement holdings in the exclusive economic zones and territorial waters of Papua New Guinea, Fiji, Tonga, the Solomon Islands, Vanuatu and New Zealand as well as other areas outside the Western Pacific. The company collapsed in 2019 due to a lack of liquidity, poor management and ability to secure funding. 

The company's board had secured loans through Deep Sea Mining Finance Ltd, a finance company setup by Mawarid Mining LLC a major shareholder of Nautilus Minerals. Deep Sea Mining Finance Ltd received Nautilus's assets after the company's bankruptcy.

Solwara 1 Resource 

Nautilus's first mining site, Solwara 1, is 30 kilometers off the shore of Papua New Guinea's New Ireland Province.

The company's Solwara 1 Project is located at 1600 metres water depth in the Bismarck Sea, New Ireland Province. It will be the world's first deep-sea mining project. The deposit is a high grade copper-gold seafloor massive sulphide (SMS) resource.

In 2007 the exploration team drilled a 43-101 resource on the Solwara 1 Project using newly developed remotely-operated vehicle (ROV) drills. The resulting high grade copper-gold resource was the world's first Seafloor Massive Sulphide ("SMS") resource statement. In 2010/11 further drilling was conducted at Solwara 1 resulting in an increase in the resource base. Results of the updated resource were as follows (November 25, 2011):

Indicated Mineral Resource: 1,030kt @ 7.2% Cu, 5.0 g/t Au, 23 g/t Ag, 0.4% Zn

Inferred Mineral Resource: 1,540kt @ 8.1% Cu, 6.4 g/t Au, 34 g/t Ag, 0.9% Zn

The 2011 Golders Resource update also saw the companies second resource declared for the Solwara 12 project (230K t), some 25 km NE of Solwara 1, in the zone of Exploration License (EL) 1324.

Deep Sea Mining Finance, a privately owned company in which the Sultanate of Oman has an interest, took over all of what was formerly Nautilus's undersea mining venture including equipment and underwater robots, and intends to exploit the Papua New Guinea Solwara 1 mining licenses.

References

External links
 http://news.nationalgeographic.com/2016/07/deep-sea-mining-five-facts/
 http://voices.nationalgeographic.com/2016/07/21/deep-sea-mining-an-invisible-land-grab/
 Official company website

Companies formerly listed on the Toronto Stock Exchange
Mining companies of Canada
Underwater mining